Hamunin ang Bukas... is a 1988 Filipino drama film about show business. It was directed by Chito B. Tapawan and stars Cherie Gil, Daniel Fernando, Odette Khan, Angie Ferro, Renato del Prado, Zorayda Sanchez, Tess Dumpit, Andro Guevarra, and Mark Tiongson. The film was released on October 27, 1988 as part of the 1st Chamber of Progressive Filipino Motion Picture Producers Film Festival (CPFMPP).

Cast
Cherie Gil
Daniel Fernando
Odette Khan
Angie Ferro
Renato del Prado
Zorayda Sanchez
Tess Dumpit
Andro Guevarra
Mark Tiongson
Ray Alsona
Dave Guanzon
Mon Recto
Mennen Torres
Billy Viña
Vilma Perez
Lou Veloso
Giovanni Calvo

Release
Hamunin ang Bukas... was released on October 27, 1988 as part of the 1st Chamber of Progressive Filipino Motion Picture Producers Film Festival (CPFMPP). It was a box office failure.

Critical response
Lav Diaz, writing for the Manila Standard, gave the film a mixed review. He considered it the most exceptional film at the CPFMPP for its subject matter about show business, as it gives a different type of story from the other nine entries of the festival. However, he criticized its substandard scenes, dialogue, and "irritating" acting for hampering the film's quality, but expressed that Cherie Gil's performance was "okay".

References

1988 films
1988 drama films
Filipino-language films
Films about the arts
Philippine drama films